Talatat are limestone blocks of standardized size (c. 27 by 27 by 54 cm, corresponding to  by  by 1 ancient Egyptian cubits) used during the 18th Dynasty reign of the Pharaoh Akhenaten in the building of the Aton temples at Karnak and Akhetaten (modern Amarna). The standardized size and their small weight made construction more efficient. Their use may have begun in the second year of Akhenaten's reign. After the Amarna Period talatat construction was abandoned, apparently not having withstood the test of time.

Amenhotep IV talatats
The blocks used in the Temple of Amenhotep IV in Karnak, and the other abandoned temples devoted to the deity Aten, were reused by Horemheb and Ramesses II as filler material for pylons and as foundations for large buildings. The Great Hypostyle Hall at Karnak is built on thousands of these blocks, as is the Second Pylon.

Tens of thousands of the talatat have been recovered. The decorated stones are being photographed and the scenes they depict are reconstructed as part of the Akhenaten Temple Project.

Etymology 

The term talatat was apparently used by the Egyptian workmen and introduced into the language of archaeology by the Egyptologist H. Chevrier. There are two hypotheses as to the word's generally unknown ultimate origin in reference to the stones, perhaps not contradictory:

The word may be derived from Italian tagliata, meaning cut masonry.

Or, derived from the Egyptian Arabic word تلاتة‎ (talāta, 'three'), indicating that each block is three hand-spans long.

References

Bibliography

External links

Talatat wall Scene www.usu.edu
Akhenaten worshipping scene: Talatat Article euler.sle.edu

Egyptian artefact types
Building stone